Loved by Few, Hated by Many may refer to:

 Loved by Few, Hated by Many (Lil' Keke album), 2008
 Loved by Few, Hated by Many (Willie D album), 2000